Tessaracoccus lapidicaptus is a facultatively anaerobic, Gram-positive, non-spore-forming and non-motile bacterium from the genus Tessaracoccus which has been isolated from the deep subsurface of the Iberian pyrite belt from Peña de Hierro, Spain.

References 

Propionibacteriales
Bacteria described in 2014